Marcelle Karp, a.k.a. Betty Boob, (born 1964), is an American feminist writer, editor, and television director and producer.

Career 
In 1993, Karp and Debbie Stoller produced the first issue of Bust, "The Magazine for Women With Something to Get Off Their Chests", now seen as one of the flagship publications of third-wave feminism, for mixing feminism with sexuality. Betty Boob was the name that Karp used in writing for the magazine (Stoller used Celina Hex). The two women met while working for Nickelodeon in New York City. They built a grassroots following, eventually distributing 100,000 copies of each issue. Her 1999 book with Stoller, "The Bust Guide to the New Girl Order", is a collection of articles from that magazine. She was forced out of Bust in 2001.

After she left Bust, Karp began a career in broadcast as a Creative Director, working for BET, fuse, MSG, Lifetime, VH1. She continued to write for a various of publications including Sesame Street Workshop, Publishers Weekly and Covey Club. In 2012, she began produced the live stand-up show, Hello Giggles Presents at the Upright Citizen's Brigade Theatre, hosted by her daughter, Ruby Karp. It eventually became We Hope You Have Fun. Karp remains active as an activist, and spoke at Riot Fest in 2014.  Her debut YA novel, Getting Over Max Cooper, will be out April 2022.

Personal life 
Marcelle Karp is the mother of writer Ruby Karp. She married in 2000, shortly after her daughter's birth, then divorced in 2002.

References

External links
 Getting it Off Her Chest - Womanrock.com e-interview with Karp about "The Bust Guide to the New Girl Order"

1964 births
Living people
American feminist writers
American women writers
American magazine founders
21st-century American women